Ivica Kalinić (born 26 March 1956) is a Croatian former professional football manager and player. He is currently the sporting director of the club NK Prugovo. 

He has played for Hajduk Split, Maribor, Osijek, Tirol Innsbruck and Grazer AK in his club career.

Kalinić has managed Istra Pula, Posušje, Solin, Imotski, Uskok, Mosor, Široki Brijeg, Šibenik and Hajduk Split in his managerial career.

Managerial career
Kalinić worked as an assistant to Ivan Katalinić at Hajduk Split and to Tomislav Ivić in the United Arab Emirates and he successfully managed Bosnian Premier League club Široki Brijeg for one season, winning the 2006−07 Bosnian Cup. After that, he became the new manager of Croatian First Football League club Šibenik, finishing in the 6th place in the 2008–09 Croatian First Football League season.

Hajduk Split
After Široki Brijeg and Šibenik, Kalinić landed the job as Hajduk Split manager after Ante Miše resigned, because of a defeat against Zadar in August 2009.

Kalinić managed only one game for Hajduk and that was the third round of the UEFA Europa League against Žilina on home ground. After Hajduk conceded a goal in the 76th minute of the game, they were losing 1–2 on aggregate. In the late minutes of the game, Kalinić suffered heart problems and was taken to the hospital. He was clinically dead for 20 seconds and reanimated twice.

After recovering, he retired from managing and became sporting director at Hajduk where he remained until his full retirement in 2012.

Honours

Player
Hajduk Split
 Yugoslav Cup: 1976–77

Maribor
 Slovenian Republic Cup: 1980–81

Manager
Široki Brijeg
 Bosnian Cup: 2006−07

References

External links
Ivica Kalinić at eurosport.com

1956 births
Living people
Footballers from Split, Croatia
Association football defenders
Yugoslav footballers
HNK Hajduk Split players
NK Maribor players
NK Osijek players
FC Swarovski Tirol players
Grazer AK players
Yugoslav First League players
Austrian Football Bundesliga players
Yugoslav expatriate footballers
Expatriate footballers in Austria
Yugoslav expatriate sportspeople in Austria
Croatian football managers
NK Istra managers
HŠK Posušje managers
NK Solin managers
NK Imotski managers
NK Mosor managers
NK Široki Brijeg managers
HNK Šibenik managers
HNK Hajduk Split managers
Croatian Football League managers
Premier League of Bosnia and Herzegovina managers
Croatian expatriate football managers
Expatriate football managers in Bosnia and Herzegovina
Croatian expatriate sportspeople in Bosnia and Herzegovina
Croatian expatriate sportspeople in the United Arab Emirates
Croatian expatriate sportspeople in Ukraine
HNK Hajduk Split non-playing staff